Andreani is an Italian surname, derived from Andrea (Andrew). Notable people with the surname include:

Aldo Andreani (1887–1971), Italian architect and sculptor
Andrea Andreani (1540–1623), Italian engraver
André-ani (1901–1953), American costume designer
Clément Henri Andreani (1901-1953), American costume designer
George Andreani (1901–1979), Polish film score composer of Argentine films
Giulia Andreani (born 1985), Italian artist
Henri Andréani (1877–1936), French film director of the silent era
Isabelle Andréani (1923–2018), French mezzo-soprano
Jacques Andreani (1929–2015), French diplomat
Marcelo Andreani (1910-1982), Italian-born Mexican professional wrestler 
Paolo Andreani (1763–1823), Italian who made the first balloon flight over Italian soil

Other uses 
Palazzo Sormani-Andreani, seat of the central public library of Milan

Italian-language surnames
Patronymic surnames
Surnames from given names